Nenad Jakšić (Serbian Cyrillic: Ненад Јакшић; born 12 October 1965) is a Serbian former professional footballer who played as a forward.

Career
Jakšić began his playing career at his hometown club Dinamo Vranje. He then spent five seasons with Radnički Niš, playing in the Yugoslav First League between 1987 and 1992. Jakšić also played professionally in Cyprus and Greece.

Jakšić represented Yugoslavia at the 1988 Summer Olympics in Seoul, failing to make any appearances during the tournament.

After finishing his playing career, Jakšić was the president of his former club Dinamo Vranje from January to August 2009.

Career statistics

References

External links
 

1965 births
Living people
Serbian footballers
Yugoslav footballers
Serbia and Montenegro footballers
Association football forwards
FK Dinamo Vranje players
FK Radnički Niš players
Footballers at the 1988 Summer Olympics
Olympic footballers of Yugoslavia
Yugoslav First League players
Serbia and Montenegro expatriate footballers
Serbia and Montenegro expatriate sportspeople in Cyprus
Expatriate footballers in Cyprus
Serbia and Montenegro expatriate sportspeople in Greece
Expatriate footballers in Greece
People from Vranje